Fran O'Leary is an Irish soccer coach. He is currently the men's head coach for the  UMass Minutemen.

Playing career
O'Leary played on the youth team of League of Ireland Club, St. Patrick's Athletic."

Coaching career

He started his coaching career as an assistant at Boston College, and later the University of New Hampshire. From 1989 to 1991, he served as the men's soccer head coach at Elmira College, where he posted a 38-11-2 record. From 1992 to 1993, he moved to Kenyon College, where he posted a 32-4-4 record as a head coach. From 1994 to 2000, he was the men's soccer head coach at Dartmouth College, where he went 56-48-14. From 2001 to 2005, he served as the men's soccer head coach at George Mason University.  He posted a career record of 160-96-32.

From 2005 to 2012, he served as the men's soccer head coach at Bowdoin College, where he went 74-39-14.

In 2013 O'Leary was made an assistant coach of Toronto FC. He was fired in 2014 along with head coach Ryan Nelsen, assistants Jim Brennan and Duncan Oughton, and strength and conditioning coach Adrian Lamb.

In February 2015, O'Leary was named Men's Soccer Head Coach at the University of Massachusetts.

Personal life

O'Leary was born in Dublin, Ireland. He is married with two children.

References

External links
http://athletics.bowdoin.edu/sports/fall/msoc/coaches/index
 UMass Minutemen bio

Irish emigrants to the United States
Elmira Eagles men's soccer coaches
Kenyon Lords soccer coaches
Dartmouth Big Green men's soccer coaches
George Mason Patriots men's soccer coaches
Boston College Eagles men's soccer coaches
New Hampshire Wildcats men's soccer coaches
Bowdoin College people
Toronto FC non-playing staff
UMass Minutemen soccer coaches
Living people
Year of birth missing (living people)
Republic of Ireland football managers
Republic of Ireland expatriate football managers
Irish expatriate sportspeople in the United States
Expatriate soccer managers in the United States
Sportspeople from Dublin (city)